is the twenty-sixth single by Japanese artist Masaharu Fukuyama. It was released on 11 August 2010.

Track listing

Chart rankings 
All figures are for "Hotaru" or the single as a whole, unless otherwise stated.

Reported sales and certifications

References

2010 singles
Masaharu Fukuyama songs
Oricon Weekly number-one singles
Billboard Japan Hot 100 number-one singles
Japanese television drama theme songs
2010 songs